Schulenburg High School or Schulenburg Secondary School is a public high school located in Schulenburg, Texas (USA) and classified as a 2A school by the UIL. It is part of the Schulenburg Independent School District located in south central Fayette County. In 2015, the school was rated "Met Standard" by the Texas Education Agency.

Athletics
The Schulenburg Shorthorns compete in these sports - 

Baseball
Basketball
Cross Country
Football
Golf
Powerlifting
Softball
Track and Field
Volleyball
Tennis

State Titles
Football -  
1972(1A), 1991(2A), 1992(2A)
Girls Golf - 
1995(1A)
Boys Track - 
1975(1A), 2016(3A), 2017(3A)
Girls Track - 
1993(2A)
Volleyball - 
2014(2A)

Academics

State Titles
One Act Play 
1948(B), 1950(B), 1951(B), 1960(3A), 1964(1A)

References

External links
 Schulenburg ISD

Schools in Fayette County, Texas
Public high schools in Texas